The AWA World Heavyweight Championship was a professional wrestling world heavyweight championship promoted by Paul Bowser in Boston.

The title was created by Bowser after Gus Sonnenberg, who had beaten Ed Lewis for the original World Heavyweight Wrestling Championship in 1929, was stripped of recognition as champion by the National Boxing Association. Browser continued to recognize Sonnenberg as champion and named his championship after the "American Wrestling Association" governing body, which hitherto did not actually exist. Rival promoters, including Jack Curley, countered by forming the National Wrestling Association and its NWA World Heavyweight Championship.

During Don Eagle's second reign, splinter titles were created by regional promoters in Chicago and Ohio. Bowser abandoned the championship later in Eagle's reign, while he was rendered inactive due to injuries in November 1952.

Title history

AWA World Heavyweight Championship (Boston version)

Splinter titles

AWA World Heavyweight Championship (Chicago version)

AWA World Heavyweight Championship (Ohio version)
Ohio-based promoter Al Haft created a splinter version of the title after recognizing Don Eagle's loss to Dr. Bill Miller on May 1, 1952 as a title change. The change was not recognized by Bowser. That title continued until 1954 when incumbent Buddy Rogers was stripped of the title.

Footnotes

References

External links

 AWA World Heavyweight Championship (Boston) at Pro Wrestling Historical Society
 AWA World Heavyweight Championship (Ohio) at Pro Wrestling Historical Society
 AWA World Heavyweight Championship (Chicago) at Wrestling-Titles.com

World heavyweight wrestling championships
Professional wrestling in Boston